Cyril of Constantinople was the legendary founder of the Carmelite Order.

Cyril of Constantinople may also refer to:

Cyril Lucaris (d. 1638), Ecumenical Patriarch of Constantinople
Cyril II of Constantinople (d. 1640), Ecumenical Patriarch
Cyril III of Constantinople (d. 1654), Ecumenical Patriarch
Cyril IV of Constantinople (d. 1728), Ecumenical Patriarch
Cyril V of Constantinople (d. 1775), Ecumenical Patriarch
Cyril VI of Constantinople (d. 1821), Ecumenical Patriarch
Cyril VII of Constantinople (d. 1872), Ecumenical Patriarch